Elvina Mable Hall (4 June 1820 – 18 July 1889) was an American songwriter who wrote the lyrics to the well-known hymn, which is now known as "Jesus Paid It All," also known as "I hear the Saviour say" (Christ All and in All).

Biography
Elvina Mable Reynolds was born in Alexandria, Virginia in 1820 to Captain David Reynolds. She married Richard Hall of Westmoreland County, Virginia, who died 1859. They had at least three children together that lived to adulthood, Agnes, Asenath, and Ella, and two that died as infants, Benoni and Ada. In the spring of 1865, Hall wrote "Jesus Paid It All" "on the fly-leaf of the New Lute of Zion hymnal, in the choir of the Methodist Episcopal Church, Baltimore." Hall then shared the lyrics with her pastor who connected her with the church organist, John Grape (1835-1915), who had recently shared a new tune he had written. Hall and Grape worked to finish the hymn together, and then at the pastor's "urging, they sent the hymn to Professor Theodore Perkins, publisher of the Sabbath Carols periodical, where it received its first publication. It has been a favorite of many American Christians ever since." Hall was a member of the church for forty years. In 1885 Hall remarried to Thomas Myers (1813-1894), a Methodist minister, at the home of her daughter, Ella. Elvina Hall died in Ocean Grove, New Jersey on July 18, 1889, and her funeral was held at the Strawbridge Methodist Church, and she was buried in the Green Mount Cemetery in Baltimore.

References

1818 births
1889 deaths
Songwriters from Maryland
Musicians from Baltimore
Songwriters from Virginia
Musicians from Alexandria, Virginia
American women hymnwriters
American Methodist hymnwriters
19th-century Methodists
19th-century American women musicians